Exsilirarcha is a genus of moths of the family Crambidae. It contains only one species, Exsilirarcha graminea, which is endemic to New Zealand. Both the genus and the species were described by John Salmon and J. D. Bradley in 1956.

References

Crambidae
Endemic fauna of New Zealand
Monotypic moth genera
Moths of New Zealand
Endemic moths of New Zealand